The Price is a two-act play written in 1967 by Arthur Miller. It is about family dynamics, the price of furniture and the price of one's decisions. The play premiered on Broadway in 1968, and has been revived four times on Broadway. It was nominated for two 1968 Tony Awards.

Miller stated that he wrote the play as a response to the Vietnam War and the "avant-garde plays that to one or another degree fit the absurd styles."

Productions
The play opened on Broadway at the Morosco Theatre on February 7, 1968 where it played until the production moved to the 46th Street Theatre on November 18, 1968. The play closed on February 15, 1969 after 429 performances. The opening cast included Harold Gary as Gregory Solomon, Pat Hingle as Victor Franz, Kate Reid as Esther Franz, and Arthur Kennedy as Walter Franz.

The Price was nominated for two 1968 Tony Awards, for Best Play (Arthur Miller, writer; Robert Whitehead, producer) and Best Scenic Design (Boris Aronson). The Price lost in the "Best Play" category to Tom Stoppard's Rosencrantz and Guildenstern Are Dead. The play was profiled in the William Goldman book The Season: A Candid Look at Broadway.

A UK revival of the play was staged from August 9 to August 25, 2018 at the Theatre Royal, Bath to mark the 50th anniversary of the original run. Directed by Jonathan Church, it starred Brendan Coyle as Victor, Sara Stewart as Esther, Adrian Lukis as Walter and David Suchet as Gregory Solomon. The production transferred to Wyndham's Theatre in London's West End from February 5 to April 27, 2019.

It will be revived in the Gate Theatre (Dublin, Ireland) in 2023, directed by Conleth Hill.

Production history
The Price has been revived four times on Broadway since the original 1968 production:

Playhouse Theatre, June 19 to October 21, 1979, 144 performances, directed by John Stix
Criterion Center Stage Right, June 10 to July 19, 1992, 46 performances; directed by John Tillinger; nominated for 1993 Tony Award, Best Revival
Royale Theatre, November 15, 1999 to March 5, 2000, 128 performances; directed by James Naughton, nominated for the 2000 Tony Award, Best Revival of a Play and Drama Desk Award, Outstanding Revival of a Play
American Airlines Theatre, February 16, 2017 to May 14, 2017, directed by Terry Kinney.
Mark Ruffalo as Victor Franz
Jessica Hecht as Esther Franz
Tony Shalhoub as Walter Franz
Danny DeVito as Gregory Solomon

Notable Regional Productions:

ArtSpace at Crestwood Court, closed February 13, 2011
Octagon Theatre, March 10 - April 2, 2011
ACT Theatre, Seattle, Washington, May 30, 2014 to June 22, 2014
Mark Taper Forum at the Center Theatre Group, February 11, 2015 to March 22, directed by Garry Hynes.
Artists Repertory Theatre, March 31, 2015 to April 26, 2015
TimeLine Theatre, Chicago, Illinois, August 2015 to November 2015
Arena Stage, Washington, DC, October to November 2017, featuring Hal Linden as Gregory Solomon

Overview
After the Great Depression, Victor Franz gave up going to college to support his father. After 30 years, Victor returns to sell his parents’ estate. His wife, Esther, his brother, Walter, and a canny furniture dealer have their own agendas. Victor must finally deal with his sacrifice.

Characters
Victor Franz - A police sergeant, eligible for retirement and approaching his fiftieth birthday. The character is based on Irving Abrams, Miller's childhood friend, who attended Columbia University and had the highest IQ on the NYC police force.
Esther Franz - Victor's wife, it is suggested that Esther may have a problem with drinking.
Gregory Solomon - A wily Russian-Jewish antique dealer, an octogenarian. Michael Billington of The Guardian described the character as "a blissfully comic creation who, at first, appears to have wandered in from a Neil Simon play, but who is well aware this is his last chance to defy time."
Walter Franz - Victor's brother, a successful doctor Victor hasn't spoken to in years.

Adaptations
 — film by Mikhail Kalik. USSR 1969 year.

The Price was adapted for television, directed by Fielder Cook from a script by Miller, and broadcast as part of the Hallmark Hall of Fame on the NBC network on February 3, 1971. David Burns played Mr. Solomon, Colleen Dewhurst played Mrs. Franz, George C. Scott played Victor Franz, and Barry Sullivan played Walter Franz. The production was nominated for four Emmy Awards, including Outstanding Single Performance by an Actor in a Leading Role (Scott), Outstanding Performance by an Actor in a Supporting Role in Drama (Burns), Outstanding Directorial Achievement in Drama - A Single Program (Cook), and Outstanding Single Program - Drama or Comedy (David Susskind, producer). Scott and Cook won.

Awards and nominations

Original Broadway production

1971 Television Special

1979 Broadway revival

1992 Broadway revival

1999 Broadway revival

2017 Broadway revival

References

Further reading

External links
 
 
  (archive)

1968 plays
American plays adapted into films
Plays by Arthur Miller
Broadway plays
Plays set in New York City